Kortrijk Xpo is one of the biggest multi-purpose indoor arenas and convention centres in the BENELUX, covering some  (2009). The complex is situated in the city of Kortrijk, Belgium and is home to some internationally renowned fairs, like the Kortrijk design fair Interieur and Busworld.

History 
The City of Kortrijk initiated the construction of the first exposition halls in 1966 in Kortrijk-South (Kortrijk-Zuid), close to the highway exit of the plannen E3, the current E17. The 'Kortrijk Halls' were officially inaugurated in April 1967. As a result of the more international approach of the exhibition centre, on 2 December 1999, the name was transformed into Kortrijk Xpo. 

This makes the complex one of the biggest fair centres in the BENELUX and even Europe. A new multipurpose hall, 'XXL', the so-called 'Black Box', was added in 2009.

Fairs 
Among others the following trade fairs are held in Kortrijk:
International Design Fair Interieur
Busworld
Euro Dogg Show
Classics
Kortrijk Winter Carnival
Millionaires Fair
Sea Side Show
Hairstyle Benelux
Architect@Work

Accessibility 
The Kortrijk Xpo complex can be reached by the Highway E17, exit 2, and the ringroad R8. 

The city bus network (operated by De Lijn) ensures a direct connection with the Kortrijk main railway station. Lines 1, 12 and 13 are directly linked with Kortrijk Xpo.

Notes

External links
Kortrijk Xpo official site
Gruzenberg
Video about Kortrijk Xpo

Indoor arenas in Belgium
Convention centres in Belgium
Tourist attractions in West Flanders
Buildings and structures in Kortrijk